Kenta (written: , , ,  or  in katakana) is a masculine Japanese given name. Notable people with the name include:

, Japanese baseball player
, Japanese film director
, Japanese kickboxer
, Japanese professional wrestler
, Japanese professional wrestler known in WWE as Hideo Itami, and otherwise his first name stylized in all caps
, Japanese international football player
, Japanese footballer
, Japanese footballer
, Japanese baseball player
, Japanese table tennis player
, Japanese voice actor
, Japanese footballer
, Japanese judoka
, Japanese footballer
, Japanese footballer
, Japanese footballer
, Japanese singer, member of South Korean groups JBJ and JBJ95
, Japanese volleyball player
, Japanese field hockey player
, Japanese footballer
, Japanese footballer
, Japanese footballer

Fictional characters
 in Hikari Sentai Maskman
 in Ani-Yoko
 in Denji Sentai Megaranger
 in Digimon Tamers
 Kenta, civilian name of Lung, a villain in the web publication Worm

See also
 Kentarō
 Tarō (given name)

Japanese masculine given names